Michael Essex (born 9 July 1985 in Ruislip, London) is a professional Rugby union player. He plays as a hooker for North Otago Rugby Football Union. He was formally player for Munster Rugby. He has played for Ireland as a schoolboy, U19 and U21 international, his father Andy Essex is a former Wasps, Metropolitan Police and Middlesex player.

References

External links
Munster profile

1985 births
Living people
English rugby union players
Munster Rugby players
North Otago rugby union players
Rugby union players from Ruislip
Shannon RFC players
University College Cork RFC players
Rugby union hookers